Ars Musica is the ninth full-length album by the Spanish power metal band Dark Moor, released on 18 June 2013.

Track listing
 "Ars Musica (Intro)" - 02:05
 "First Lance of Spain" - 05:06 	 
 "This Is My Way" - 04:17 	 
 "The Road Again" - 04:34 	 
 "Together as Ever" - 04:53 	 
 "The City of Peace" - 04:08 	 
 "Gara and Jonay" - 04:27 	 
 "Living in a Nightmare" - 04:22 	 
 "El Último Rey" - 05:18 	 
 "St. James Way" - 04:07 	 
 "Asturias (Outro suite)" - 05:32
 "The Road Again" (Acoustic version - Bonus track on some CDs) - 02:43 	 
 "Living in a Nightmare" (Orchestral version - Bonus track on some CDs) - 04:19

Japanese edition bonus disc
These tracks are orchestral versions of some songs including a bonus track.

 "The Road Again (Acoustic version)" - 02:43 	 
 "Living in a Nightmare" - 04:19
 "This Is My Way" - 04:06
 "Together As Ever" - 04:15 	 
 "El Último Rey" - 04:38 	 
 "First Lance Of Spain" - 04:57 	 
 "Bohemian Caprice (Bonus Track)" - 02:51

Concepts
"First Lance of Spain" is based in the life of Diego de Leon.
"The City of Peace" is based on the city of Toledo, known as 'The Three Cultures City'.
"Gara & Jonay" is based on a legend from La Gomera & Tenerife islands
"Living in a Nightmare" is based in the life of the Spanish painter Francisco de Goya,
"El Ultimo Rey" means "The Last King" in Spanish and is based in the life of the last Granada Muslim king, Boabdil el Chico
"Saint James' Way" is inspired in the legendary tradition in Spanish culture.

Personnel
Alfred Romero - vocals & acoustic guitars
Enrik García -	guitars & piano
Mario García - bass
Roberto Cappa - drums

Additional musicians
Berenice Musa - soprano voice
Luigi Stefanini - piano on #03, hammond organ on #06

Production
Luigi Stefanini - Producer
Nathlia Suellen - Cover art

References

External links
 Dark Moor official website

2013 albums
Dark Moor albums
Scarlet Records albums